Muschampia protheon is a small butterfly found in the East Palearctic (Central China (Kuku-Noor) to East Mongolia and Transbaikalia ) that belongs to the skippers family.

Description from Seitz

H. protheon Rambr. (85 f). Five apical dots: all the spots of the upperside distinct. Hindwing beneath light brown; subterminal band composed of distinctly separated spots. The white spot between veins 3 and 4 less projecting than the cell-spot situated above it. South Russia.

Biology
The larva feeds on Phlomoides tuberosa.

See also
List of butterflies of Russia

References

Pyrginae